Dannielynn Hope Marshall Birkhead (born Hannah Rose Marshall Stern; September 7, 2006) is an American reality television personality and model. She is the daughter of Anna Nicole Smith and Larry Birkhead and was the focus of the Dannielynn Birkhead paternity case.

Early life and paternity 

Dannielynn Hope Marshall Birkhead, named Hannah Rose Marshall Stern at birth, was born to Anna Nicole Smith on September 7, 2006, in Nassau, The Bahamas. Almost immediately, questions over her paternity arose, quickly followed by the death of her  half-brother, Daniel Smith, three days after her birth. Daniel Smith's death and Dannielynn's custody preceded the paternity claims made by attorney Howard K. Stern, Larry Birkhead, Anna Nicole's bodyguard Alexander Denk, and Frederic von Anhalt, husband of the actress Zsa Zsa Gabor. Smith named Howard K. Stern as the father on her daughter's birth certificate.

Birkhead, a celebrity photographer from Kentucky, brought his challenge to court to legitimize his claim. After DNA testing, Birkhead was formally established as the father. After gaining custody of his daughter, Dannielynn’s surname was changed from Stern to Birkhead.

When Birkhead was five months old, her mother died of an accidental drug overdose at the Seminole Hard Rock Hotel and Casino in Hollywood, Florida. In 2008, she was declared sole heir to Smith's estate, estimated at $700,000.

At 16 months old, Birkhead underwent surgery to correct the strabismus in one of her eyes. Her father wore a patch as well so the pair could "play pirates together".

Modeling and media focus 
At age six, Birkhead participated  in  a modeling campaign for children's line Guess Kids. Guess co founder Paul Marciano stated "Dannielynn has the same playful spirit that her mother had on a set." The campaign was followed by the Spring 2013 line.

In August 2014, federal court judge David O. Carter ruled Dannielynn Birkhead will not receive $44 million from the estate of the late E. Pierce Marshall, the son of J. Howard Marshall. Her father was hopeful that Dannielynn would receive a substantial amount of money in sanctions. Judge Carter denied this request, ruling that there was "just no evidence before the court that justifies awarding sanctions against Pierce Marshall's estate".

Since 2008, Birkhead and her father have attended the Kentucky Derby, where her parents had first met. At the 2021 Kentucky Derby, Birkhead wore a turquoise pantsuit from Jovani Fashion with a large white flower fascinator. At the 2022 event, she wore an outfit previously worn by singer Janet Jackson to the same event in 2003.

Filmography

References

External links 
 

2006 births
People from Nassau, Bahamas
Living people
American child models
Anna Nicole Smith
Participants in American reality television series
People from Louisville, Kentucky